Garhwa is a town and a municipality in, and headquarters of, Garhwa district in the state of Jharkhand, India. Uttar Pradesh, Chhattisgarh and Bihar are nearby states. Garhwa Road (Rehla) is a major Railway Junction where thousands of passengers find this station most convenient to catch their train for Delhi and Kolkata. You can find bus services for Ranchi, Ambikapur, Gaya etc.

History
The erstwhile Garhwa Subdivision of Palamau district consisting of 8 Blocks was separated from Palamau district as an independent district "Garhwa" with effect from 1 April 1991.

History, Garhwa District - Garhwa</ref> It is situated on Southwest corner of Palamu division, which lies between 23060’and 24039’ N latitude and 83022’ and 84000’ E longitude. The district is surrounded by river Sone in the north; Palamu district and area of Chhattisgarh in the south; Palamau district in the east and Surguja district of Chhattisgarh and Sonebhadra district of U.P. in the west. Garhwa district is a part of Palamau Commissionery consisting of 19 blocks and two subdivisions namely Garhwa and Nagar-Untrai.

Geography and geology

Nearest railway station is Garhwa Town, Indian Railway Code for Garhwa town is GHQ. Another nearby railway station (around 10 km away) is Garwa Road, Indian Railway Code for Garhwa road is GHD.

Transport
All major express and passenger trains stop at Garhwa railway station.

 Ranchi,
  Lucknow,
 Kolkata,
 Kota,
 Bhopal Junction,
 Delhi,
 Jabalpur,
 Patna,
 Varanasi
 Gaya.

Garhwa is well connected with
 Ranchi, 
 Jamshedpur, 
 Dhanbad,
 Kolkata,
 Varanasi, 
 Ambikapur,
 Durgapur, 
 Raipur,
 Patna,
 Delhi,
 Lucknow, 
 Allahabad, 
 Kota, 
 Kanpur, 
 Ramanujganj,
 Renukoot,
etc., by road.

Demographics
 India census, Garhwa had a population of 46059. Males constitute 54% of the population and females 46%. Garhwa has an average literacy rate of 61%, higher than the national average of 59.5%: male literacy is 69%, and female literacy is 51%. In Garhwa, 17% of the population is under 6 years of age.

Tourist areas
 "Gadhdevi Temple", to which people come from different parts of Jharkhand.
 Satbahini Fall, which has been popular from the British era and still attracts tourists from the state.
 "The Kali Temple", also known as Kali Sthan, where it is believed Goddess Kali fulfils the dreams of her worshippers.
 Ranka Raj Palace, where shooting of movie Aaj Ka Robin Hood was done.
 Khonhar Mandir, Gijna, is a famous temple to Lord Shiva, which has a history and a religious story behind it.

See also
Garhwa district
Garhwa railway station
Latehar district
Palamu district
Jharkhand
Nagar Untari

References

External links
Garhwa District's webpage

Garhwa district
Community development blocks in Jharkhand
Community development blocks in Garhwa district
Cities and towns in Garhwa district